Adrienne Adams may refer to:
 Adrienne Adams (illustrator) (1906–2002), American illustrator
 Adrienne Adams (politician) (born 1960), American politician